Nathan Waller  (born 19 November 1991) is a former Zimbabwean first-class cricketer. He represented Zimbabwe at Under-19 level in 2009 and 2010, and has also appeared domestically for Centrals in the 2008–09 Faithwear Clothing Inter-Provincial One-Day Competition.

In June 2017, he was named in Zimbabwe's Test squad for their one-off match against Sri Lanka.

References

1991 births
Living people
Sportspeople from Harare
Centrals cricketers
Zimbabwean cricketers
Northern Knights cricketers